Banco Invest is an investing bank located in Lisboa, Portugal and provides corporate finance for mergers and acquisitions, capital markets, partnerships, and restructuring.

The original name was the Banco Alves Ribeiro from February 1997, the recent name is from October 2005.

References 

Banks of Portugal
Banks established in 1997
1997 establishments in Portugal